Bloomsbury is a town and coastal locality in the Mackay Region, Queensland, Australia.

Geography 
The Bruce Highway traverses the locality from south to north, passing through the town which is approximately in the centre of the locality. The North Coast railway also traverses the locality from south to north, running mostly parallel and immediately west of the highway, with the town serviced by the Bloomsbury railway station.

The Cathu State Forest is in the south-west of the locality. Apart from that, the locality is a mixture of low-lying farming land, mostly used for sugarcane. There is a cane tramway through the locality to transport the harvested sugarcane to the local sugar mills. Other parts of the locality are mountainous and undeveloped.

History 
Bloomsbury State School opened on 16 May 1927.

A postal receiving office opened at Bloomsbury around 1896, became a post office in March 1909, and closed around 1916. A second receiving office opened around 1925, became a post office in March 1926 and closed around 1993.

Education 
Bloomsbury State School is a government primary (Prep-6) school for boys and girls at 8545 Bruce Highway. In 2016, the school had an enrolment of 80 students with 7 teachers (5 full-time equivalent) and 6 non-teaching staff (3 full-time equivalent). In 2018, the school had an enrolment of 49 students with 5 teachers (3 full-time equivalent) and 8 non-teaching staff (3 full-time equivalent). The school draws its students from both the Bloomsbury and adjacent Midge Point localities.

There are no secondary schools in Bloomsbury. The nearest government secondary schools are Calen District State College in Calen to the south-east and Proserpine State High School in Proserpine to the north.

Amenities 
The Mackay Regional Council operates a mobile library service on a fortnightly schedule at the Bruce Highway near the school.

Attractions
Clarke Range Lookout is at the end of the Cathu Cauley Road. The lookout provides excellent views of the Whitsunday Coast.

References

External links 
 

Towns in Queensland
Mackay Region
Coastline of Queensland
Localities in Queensland